The Province of Sira, also known  as Carnatic-Balaghat, was a subah (imperial first-level province) of the Mughal empire in South India that was established in 1687 by conquering emperor Aurangzeb (like Bijapur in 1686 and Golkonda in 1687) and lasted until 1757. The province, which comprised the Carnatic region south of the Tungabhadra river, had its  capital in the town of Sira. It was composed of seven parganas (districts): Basavapatna, Budihal, Sira, Penukonda, Dod-Ballapur, Hoskote and Kolar; in addition, Harpanahalli, Kondarpi, Anegundi, Bednur, Chitaldroog and Mysore were considered by the Mughals to be tributary states of the province.

Administration 

After the  Moghul armies overran the region of the Mysore plateau, 12 parganas were annexed to the newly formed province (subah) of Sira.  The remaining region was allowed to remain under the rule of the Poligars, who were required to pay tribute to the provincial government in Sira.  In the annexed regions, in which tax assessment on cultivation was under amāni or Sarkār (i.e. provincial government) management, several types of officers collected and managed revenue.  Most offices had existed in the region under the previous Bijapur Sultanate administration, and consisted, among others, of Deshmūks, Deshpāndes, Majmūndārs, and Kānungoyas.  The Deshmūks "settled accounts" with the village headmen (or patels); the Deshpāndes verified the account-books of the village registrars (or kārnāms); the Kānungoyas entered the official regulations in the village record-books and also explained decrees and regulations to the village governing officers and residents.
Lastly, the Majmūndārs prepared the final documents of the "settlement" (i.e. the assessment and payment of tax) and promulgated it.

Until the mid-seventeenth century, both villagers- and district (taluq) accounts had been prepared in the language and script of Kannada, the region's traditional language.
However, after the Bijapur invasions, Maratha chieftains came to wield authority in the region and brought in with them various officials who introduced the Marathi language and script into the "public accounts."  The new language found its way even into lands ruled by some poligar chiefs.  These chieftains had brought in Marathi-speaking horsemen from the northern Bijapur realms for their newly formed cavalry units; consequently, they resorted to hiring Maratha accountants for the benefit of these cavalrymen.  After the province of Sira was created, the official language of the Moghul empire, Persian, came to be used.

The capital and its monuments 
 
The capital of the province, Sira town, too, prospered most under Dilavar Khan and expanded in size to accommodate 50,000 homes. Palaces and public monuments of Sira became models for other edifices. Both Haidar Ali's palace in Bangalore and Tipu Sultan's in Seringapatam were modeled after Dilavar Khan's palace in Sira. Sira's civil servants, however, could not be as readily reproduced: after Tipu Sultan had succeeded his father as Sultan of Mysore in 1782, he deported 12,000 families, mainly of city officials, from Sira to Shahr Ganjam, a new capital he founded on Seringapatam island.

There are Mughal-era buildings that still stand in the town. Among them are the Juma Masjid.

The other towns 

Different towns and regions fared differently during the eventful seventy-year history of the province.  In Bangalore district, for example, Bangalore town was sold to the wodeyar Raja of Mysore for Rs. 300,000.  The rest of the district was divided in the following fashion:  the north was made a part of Chik Ballapur, other parts were added to Sira taluk (district), and the remainder, which included the town of Dod Ballapur, was constituted into a jagir.  This was first gifted to a general named A. H. Khuli Khan, who, however, died shortly thereafter.  The jagir, which was to yield an annual revenue of 54,000 pagodas, then passed on to his son, Darga Khuli Khan the subhahdar of Sira during 1714–1715, who too retained it for a mere year.  It was then "attached to the government of Sira" for 49 years until it was seized by the Nizam-ul-Mulk of Hyderabad, and eventually captured by Haidar Ali.

Subahdars (governors) 
Qasim Khan (also, Khasim Khan or Kasim Khan) was appointed the first Subahdar (governor) of the province in 1686.  After successfully "regulating and improving" the province for eight years, he died in 1694 under mysterious circumstances, either during an assault by Maratha raiders, or by his own hand in disgrace after the raiders seized a treasure in his care.  Most subahdars who came after him lasted only a year or two,  and the frequent changes at the helm continued until the appointment of Dilavar Khan in 1726, whose term, which lasted until 1756, finally brought some stability to the province.  In 1757, Sira was overrun by the Marathas, only to be restored to the Mughals again in 1759.  Two years later, Haidar Ali, whose own father had been the Mughal military governor (or Faujdar) of Kolar district in the province, captured Sira, and soon conferred on himself the title of "Nawab of Sira."  However, the defection of his brother, a military governor, in 1766 caused the province to be lost again to the Marathas, who retained it until Haidar's son, Tipu Sultan, recaptured it for his father in 1774.

See also 
 Sira town
 History of Mysore and Coorg, 1565–1760
 History of Mysore and Coorg, 1761–1799

Notes

References 

Mughal subahs
1687 establishments in Asia